Middle Kids are an alternative indie rock band from Sydney, Australia. The band consists of Hannah Joy (lead vocals, guitar, piano), Tim Fitz (bass, backing vocals, production) and Harry Day (drums, backing vocals). Since forming in 2016, the band has released their eponymous debut EP (2017), the album Lost Friends (2018), the New Songs for Old Problems EP (2019), and their second studio album Today We're the Greatest (2021).

Career

2016–2017: Formation and debut EP 
Middle Kids originally formed after Fitz offered to produce some songs for Joy's solo project after attending a show she played. Prior to Middle Kids, Fitz was also a solo artist; he released five EPs between 2011 and 2014 under his own name. They enlisted local jazz drummer Harry Day (who went to school with Joy) for a recording session, in which they recorded their debut single, "Edge of Town".

The song's radio premiere on Triple J in May 2016 was followed by a feature in Rolling Stone Australia. Shortly after the video clip's premiere on Stereogum, the song was added to Elton John's Beats 1 show. The trio won FBi Radio's Northern Lights competition (which sent them to perform in Reykjavik, Iceland at the Iceland Airwaves music festival).

The band recorded and released their debut self-titled EP in February 2017. They also toured with Paul Kelly and Steve Earle in November of that year.

2018–2019: Lost Friends
In May 2018, the band released their debut album, Lost Friends. It was primarily recorded in their Sydney home, produced by bandmember Tim Fitz, and mixed by Peter Katis.

It debuted at Number 10 on the ARIA Charts. A Pitchfork review described the sound as "radiant, anthemic indie rock, balancing doubt-ridden lyrics with clear-eyed execution". Lost Friends was nominated for the ARIA Award for Best Rock Album at the ARIA Music Awards of 2016. It won the prestigious J Award for Australian Album of the Year. The lead single "Mistake" was voted into the 2018 Triple J Hottest 100.

They played their USA TV debut on Conan. Additionally they have performed on Jimmy Kimmel Live!, The Late Late Show with James Corden and Busy Tonight. They have played live sessions for KCRW, KEXP, KTBG, WFUV, and Triple J (in which they performed a cover of "Don't Dream it's Over" by Crowded House).

The band have toured extensively in the US, performing at South by Southwest, Lollapalooza, Governors Ball Music Festival, LouFest, Firefly Music Festival, Austin City Limits Fest among others. They also opened on tours for The War on Drugs (band), Ryan Adams, Cold War Kids, Local Natives.

The band supported Bloc Party on a European tour in 2018 and played a live session in the UK at the BBC Maida Vale Studios.

The band released the EP New Songs for Old Problems in May 2019. These were released by Domino Records in the US, EMI Records in Australia, and Lucky Number in the UK.

2020–present: Today We're the Greatest
In January 2021, Middle Kids announced the release of their second studio album, alongside its second single "Questions". Today We're the Greatest was released on 19 March 2021.

Discography

Studio albums

Extended plays

Singles

Awards and nominations

ARIA Music Awards
The ARIA Music Awards is an annual awards ceremony that recognises excellence, innovation, and achievement across all genres of Australian music.

! 
|-
| 2018
| Lost Friends
| ARIA Award for Best Rock Album
| 
|
|-
| 2021
| Today We're the Greatest
| Best Rock Album
| 
|

J Awards
The J Awards are an annual series of Australian music awards that were established by the Australian Broadcasting Corporation's youth-focused radio station Triple J.

! 
|-
| 2018
| Lost Friends
| Australian Album of the Year
| 
| 
|-
| 2021
| Today We're the Greatest
| Australian Album of the Year
| 
|

National Live Music Awards
The National Live Music Awards (NLMAs) are a broad recognition of Australia's diverse live industry, celebrating the success of the Australian live scene. The awards commenced in 2016.

|-
|  2017
| Middle Kids
| International Live Achievement (Group)
| 
|-
| 2019
| Middle Kids
| Live Indie / Rock Act of the Year
| 
|-

References

External links
 Official website

ARIA Award winners
Australian indie rock groups
Domino Recording Company artists
Musical groups from Sydney